LISA is the USENIX special interest group for system administrators.  LISA was known officially as the System Administrators Guild until November 2003; from 2003 to 2010, it was known as SAGE.

In March 2016 it was announced that LISA was being retired.

Major activities

 Co-sponsors the annual system administration conference, also known as LISA.
 Hosts several technical and professional mailing lists.
 Provides a job listing service.
 Compiles an annual salary survey of system administrators' salaries keyed to many variables.
 Publishes a series of short topics booklets in the field of system administration.
 Establishes and promotes a code of ethics for system administrators.
 Supports local user groups.
 Offers an IRC channel.
 Presents an annual award for outstanding contributions to the field of system administration.

Proposed spinoff
In June 2004, SAGE was dissolved as a Special Technical Group to prepare for a spin-off from its parent organization, USENIX.  On October 27, 2005, the USENIX Board, by a 4–4 vote,  failed to approve a motion to progress the separation of SAGE from USENIX, declaring instead that SAGE is better as a suborganization. This contributed to the formation of LOPSA by individuals involved in the aborted spinoff.

See also
League of Professional System Administrators
SAGE-AU (Australia)
System Administrators Guild of Ireland

References

External links
 Official website
 SAGE@GUUG (Germany)
 cSAGE Certification
 USENIX
 LOPSA - League of Professional Systems Administrators

Information technology organizations
Professional associations based in the United States
System administration